The  is the name of an aerial lift, as well as its operator. The funitel line links between Sōunzan and Tōgendai via Ōwakudani, all within Hakone, Kanagawa, Japan. The line became funitel in 2002, the second of its kind in the nation, after Hashikurasan Ropeway. It makes a part of the sightseeing route between Odawara and Lake Ashi. The company belongs to the Odakyū Group.

Basic data
Hakone Ropeway was a single line until 2001. From 2002, it became a system consisted of two distinct sections, although they are still treated as the same line.

Between Sōunzan and Ōwakudani
System:
Bicable gondola lift, until 2001
Funitel, from 2002
Distance: 
Vertical interval: 
Maximum gradient: 25°33′
Operational speed: 5.0 m/s
Passenger capacity per a cabin: 18
Cabins: 18

Between Ōwakudani and Tōgendai
System:
Bicable gondola lift, until 2006
Funitel, from 2007
Distance: 
Vertical interval: 
Maximum gradient: 19°42′
Operational speed: 5.0 m/s
Passenger capacity per a cabin: 18
Cabins: 30

Stations
All stations at Hakone, Kanagawa.

See also
List of aerial lifts in Japan

References

External links

 Official website

Gondola lifts in Japan
Tourist attractions in Kanagawa Prefecture
Transport in Kanagawa Prefecture